Glipa longipennis is a species of beetle in the genus Glipa. It was described in 1905.

References

longipennis
Beetles described in 1905